Case for the Defence is a 1978 Australian legal TV series. It starred John Hamblin as Sydney defence lawyer John Case and Judith Arthy as Winsome Blake. Supporting cast were Max Osbiston as Proudfoot, Edward Howell as Wheems and Robert 'Tex' Morton as Rupe Case.

References

External links
Case for the Defence at IMDb
Case for the Defence at Classic Australian TV
Case for the Defence at AusLit

Australian drama television series
1978 Australian television series debuts
English-language television shows